Ọláoyè is both a surname and a given name of Yoruba origin meaning "a combination of prestige, success and wealth from/with chieftaincy". Notable people with the surname include:

Abiodun Olaoye, Nigerian Anglican bishop
David Olaoye (born 1996), English footballer of Nigerian descent
Dele Olaoye (born 1982), Nigerian footballer

Surnames of Nigerian origin